1,2-Naphthoquinone or ortho-naphthoquinone is a polycyclic aromatic organic compound with formula .  This yellow solid is prepared by oxidation of 1-amino-2-hydroxynaphthalene with ferric chloride.

Occurrence
This diketone (an ortho-quinone) is a metabolite of naphthalene.  It arises from the naphthalene-1,2-oxide.

It is also found in diesel exhaust particles. The accumulation of this toxic metabolite in rats from doses of naphthalene has been shown to cause eye damage, including the formation of cataracts.

See also 
 1,4-Naphthoquinone, an isomer of 1,2-naphthoquinone

References

External links 
 
 

1,2-Naphthoquinones